Cornelia James (née Katz; 11 March 1917 – 10 December 1999), was a British glovemaker and businesswoman. Born in Vienna, Austria to a Jewish family, James emigrated to the United Kingdom during World War II and founded her eponymous firm of glovemakers in 1946, which now holds a Royal Warrant.

Early life
Cornelia Katz was born 11 March 1917, in Vienna, Austria, the eldest of seven children of a family who ran a chain of grocery shops as well as cold storage business.

Katz studied fashion design at the Vienna Academy of Fine Arts before leaving Vienna in 1939. She left for Paris, and then London, with "a suitcase full of the coloured leather".

Career
She arrived in London as a refugee but soon set up a business making gloves, founding her own brand in 1946. In 1947, she was asked by the dress designer Norman Hartnell to make the "going-away" gloves for the then-Princess Elizabeth to take on her honeymoon, following her marriage to Philip Mountbatten. James additionally made several pairs for the Princess's trousseau, beginning her lifelong association with the British royal family. In 1948, she became known as "the Colour Queen of England" after launching her leather gloves range in 100 different shades.

Her first workshop was on Davigdor Road in Hove, near Brighton, and was established by 1947.  The business peaked in the 1950s when she was known as "the Queen's favourite glovemaker" and had between 250 and 500 workers in her factory in a former dairy in Brighton; however, the popularity of wearing fashion gloves eventually declined.  Her products remained popular with royalty, with Queen Elizabeth The Queen Mother, The Princess Royal and Diana, Princess of Wales among her clients, as well as members of the Belgian, Dutch and Swedish royal families.  "Cornelia James" officially became Royal Warrant of Appointment holders in 1979, and subsequently operated as the Queen's official glovemaker.

Personal life
After emigrating from Austria, she originally hoped to get a United States visa, but subsequently met Jack Burnett James and married him six weeks later, in 1940 (despite the fact that she had been engaged before leaving Vienna.)  Their son Peter James (b. 1948) is a best-selling writer of crime fiction. Their daughter, Genevieve James Lawson, runs "Cornelia James". James had been an active supporter of hospices and other charities throughout her time in Sussex.

Death
Cornelia James died at Martlets Hospice in Hove, Sussex, England, on 10 December 1999.

See also
Cornelia James (company)
Arnold Fulton
Herta Groves

References

External links

English businesspeople in fashion
Gloves
1917 births
1999 deaths
Academy of Fine Arts Vienna alumni
Jewish emigrants from Austria to the United Kingdom after the Anschluss
British Royal Warrant holders
Businesspeople from Vienna
Businesspeople from London
20th-century English businesspeople
20th-century English businesswomen